NEMA (National Electrical Manufacturers Association) contactors and motor starters are rated by sizes. These sizes are grouped by rated current and power.

See also
Contactor
Motor starter

References

NEMA standards